The Spark World Tour was a concert tour by rock band Enter Shikari, which took place throughout 2017 and 2018, in support of the band's fifth studio album The Spark, released on 22 September 2017. The tour  followed the band's 10 year anniversary tour of their debut album Take to the Skies throughout early 2017.

About
Following the band's 'Take to the Skies' 10th anniversary tour, the band announced a UK arena tour with support from Lower than Atlantis and Astroid Boys which included the band's second performance at the famous Alexandra Palace in London. On July 31, 2017, the band played a warmup show at The Borderline in London where they debuted the tracks "Take My Country Back" and "Live Outside."

Following the album's release on 22 September 2017, the band played a series of intimate in-store shows including at HMV Oxford Street, London and Rough Trade NYC, Brooklyn. On October 3 the band announced they would be playing a North American tour in early 2018 with support from Milk Teeth including shows at the Music Hall of Williamsburg in Brooklyn and the El Rey Theatre in Los Angeles.

In April 2018, the band embarked on an Asia tour which included 5 dates in Japan supporting Crossfaith before a series of headline shows in Hong Kong, Thailand, Singapore, Taiwan and China.

Songs Performed

Take to the Skies
 "Mothership"
 "Anything Can Happen in the Next Half Hour"
 "Labyrinth"
 "Sorry, You're Not a Winner"
 "Adieu"

Common Dreads
 "Solidarity"
 "Juggernauts"
 "Zzzonked"
 "Antwerpen"
 "The Jester"

A Flash Flood of Colour
 "...Meltdown"
 "Sssnakepit"
 "Arguing with Thermometers"
 "Stalemate"
 "Gandhi Mate, Gandhi"
 "Constellations"

Rat Race EP
 "Rat Race"
 "Radiate"

The Mindsweep
 "Anaesthetist"
 "The Last Garrison
 "Torn Apart"
 "Interlude"

Live Slow, Die Old EP
 "Redshift
 "Hoodwinker"

The Spark
 "The Spark"
 "The Sights"
 "Live Outside"
 "Take My Country Back"
 "Airfield"
 "Rabble Rouser"
 "Undercover Agents"
 "The Embers"

Covers
 "Insomnia" by Faithless
 "Heroes" by David Bowie
 "All You Need Is Love by The Beatles
 "Cars" by Gary Numan
 "Song 2" by Blur

Setlist
Taken from the band's Alexandra Palace show
The Spark (from The Spark, 2017)
The Sights (from The Spark, 2017)
Solidarity (from Common Dreads, 2009)
Anything Can Happen in the Next Half Hour (from Take to the Skies, 2007)
Take My Country Back (from The Spark, 2017)
The Last Garrison (from The Mindsweep, 2015)
Radiate (from Rat Race EP, 2013)
Undercover Agents (from The Spark, 2017)
Arguing with Thermometers (from A Flash Flood of Colour, 2012)
Rabble Rouser (from The Spark, 2017)
Airfield (from The Spark, 2017)
Adieu (from Take to the Skies, 2007)
Anaesthetist (from The Mindsweep, 2015)
Quickfire Medley (Sorry You're Not a Winner, Sssnakepit (Hamilton Remix), ...Meltdown, Antwerpen)
Zzzonked (from Common Dreads, 2009)

Encore
"Redshift
"Live Outside (from The Spark, 2017)

Tour dates

Notes

References 

2017 concert tours
2018 concert tours
Enter Shikari concert tours